Streptomyces bellus is a bacterium species from the genus of Streptomyces which has been isolated from soil. Streptomyces bellus produces althiomycin.

See also 
 List of Streptomyces species

References

Further reading

External links
Type strain of Streptomyces bellus at BacDive -  the Bacterial Diversity Metadatabase

bellus
Bacteria described in 1960